Cassinia aculeata, commonly known as common cassinia, dolly bush or dogwood , is a species of flowering plant in the family Asteraceae and is endemic to south-eastern Australia. It is an erect shrub with sessile, linear, variably-sized leaves, and heads of creamy-white to white flowers arranged in rounded cymes.

Description

Taxonomy
Dolly bush was first formally described in 1806 by Jacques Labillardière who gave it the name Calea aculeata in his book Novae Hollandiae Plantarum Specimen. In 1818, Robert Brown changed the name to Cassinia aculeata in the Transactions of the Linnean Society of London. The specific epithet (aculeata) means "prickly".

In 2009, Anthony Edward Orchard described two subspecies in Australian Systematic Botany and the names are accepted by the Australian Plant Census:
 Cassinia aculeata (Labill.) R.Br. subsp. aculeata has three or four florets in each head;
 Cassinia aculeata subsp. nova-anglica Orchard has five or six, rarely seven florets in each head.

Distribution and habitat
It is found in New South Wales, the Australian Capital Territory, Victoria and Tasmania. Subspecies nova-anglica grows at higher altitudes and is only known from the New England National Park and a single collection on the Central Tablelands.

Use in horticulture
The species is fast growing and requires heavy, moist, well-drained soils, in partial sun. It does not tolerate salt winds. Dogwood can provide a quick screen while other plants grow. It is not usually long-lived. Cassinias need pruning to maintain shape. The flowers are long-lasting and can also be dried. The foliage may cause skin irritations.

References

aculeata
Asterales of Australia
Flora of New South Wales
Flora of Tasmania
Flora of the Australian Capital Territory
Flora of Victoria (Australia)
Taxa named by Jacques Labillardière
Plants described in 1806